Jackson Hadley (May 22, 1815March 3, 1867) was an American businessman and Democratic politician.  He served three years each in the Wisconsin State Senate and Assembly, representing Milwaukee County.

Biography
Born in Livonia, New York, he was a school teacher and principal in New York state.  In 1849, he moved to Milwaukee, Wisconsin, and was in the produce and railroad businesses.  He served on the Milwaukee Common Council and was the president.  He also served on the Milwaukee County Board of Supervisors.

In the railroad business, he was a friend and business partner of Byron Kilbourn, and was implicated in the scandal in which Kilbourn was accused of bribing Wisconsin legislators to obtain land grants for railroad construction.

In 1854, 1865, and 1866, he served in the Wisconsin State Assembly; he served in the Wisconsin State Senate in 1855, 1856, and 1867.

During the 1867 legislative session, while his limbs were paralyzed and he could not walk, he actively participated in senate business as long as possible. He returned to his home in Milwaukee a few days before his death there on March 3, 1867.

References

External links
 

1815 births
1867 deaths
People from Livonia, New York
Politicians from Milwaukee
Businesspeople from Milwaukee
County supervisors in Wisconsin
Wisconsin city council members
Democratic Party Wisconsin state senators
19th-century American politicians
19th-century American businesspeople
Democratic Party members of the Wisconsin State Assembly